Municipal election for Dhangadhi took place on 13 May 2022, with all 97 positions up for election across 19 wards. The electorate elected a mayor, a deputy mayor, 19 ward chairs and 76 ward members. An indirect election will also be held to elect five female members and an additional three female members from the Dalit and minority community to the municipal executive.

Independent candidate Gopal Hamal was elected mayor of the sub-metropolitan city defeating incumbent mayor Nrip Bahadur Wad of the Nepali Congress. Congress however regained control of the council.

Background 

Dhangadhi was established in 1976 as a municipality. The sub-metropolitan city was created in 2015 by incorporating neighboring village development committees into Dhangadhi municipality. Electors in each ward elect a ward chair and four ward members, out of which two must be female and one of the two must belong to the Dalit community.

In the previous election, Nrip Bahadur Wad from Nepali Congress was elected as mayor.

Candidates

Opinion poll

Results

Mayoral election

Ward results 

|-
! colspan="2" style="text-align:centre;" | Party
! Chairman
! Members
|-
| style="background-color:;" |
| style="text-align:left;" |Nepali Congress
| style="text-align:center;" | 11
| style="text-align:center;" | 48
|-
| style="background-color:;" |
| style="text-align:left;" |CPN (Unified Marxist-Leninist)
| style="text-align:center;" | 6
| style="text-align:center;" | 24
|-
| style="background-color:;" |
| style="text-align:left;" |CPN (Maoist Centre)
| style="text-align:center;" | 2
| style="text-align:center;" | 4
|-
! colspan="2" style="text-align:right;" | Total
! 19
! 76
|}

Summary of results by ward

Council formation

See also 

 2022 Nepalese local elections
 2022 Lalitpur municipal election
 2022 Kathmandu municipal election
 2022 Janakpur municipal election
 2022 Pokhara municipal election

References 

Dhangadhi